Operation Swordfish or Operation Dominic Swordfish was the May 11, 1962 operational test of the nuclear ASROC anti-submarine weapon system. The ASROC uses a short range rocket booster to deliver a Mk 34 armed depth charge to the surface over the submarine target. The device sinks to a depth of approximately 650 feet or 235 meters where it would detonate with a yield around 10 kt of force.

References

Naval operations and battles
Cold War anti-submarine weapons of the United States
Nuclear weapons testing
May 1962 events in the United States